Herbiconiux is a Gram-positive, non-spore-forming, endophytic, obligatory aerobic and non-motile genus of bacteria from the family Microbacteriaceae.

References

Microbacteriaceae
Bacteria genera
Monotypic bacteria genera